This is a list of archaeologists – people who study or practise archaeology, the study of the human past through material remains.

A
Kamyar Abdi (born 1969) Iranian; Iran, Neolithic to the Bronze Age
Aziz Ab'Saber (1924–2012) Brazilian; Brazil
Johann Michael Ackner (1783–1862) Transylvanian; Roman Dacia
Dinu Adameșteanu (1913–2004) Romanian-Italian; aerial photography and survey of sites
James M. Adovasio (born 1944) U.S.; New World (esp. Pre-Clovis) and perishable technologies
Anagnostis Agelarakis (born 1956) Greek; archaeological and physical anthropology
Yohanan Aharoni (1919–1976) Israeli; Israel Bronze Age
Edward R. Ayrton (1882–1914)  English Egyptologist and archaeologist
Ekrem Akurgal (1911–2002) Turkish; Anatolia
Jorge de Alarcão (born 1934) Portuguese; Roman Portugal
William F. Albright (1891–1971) U.S.; Orientalist
Leslie Alcock (1925–2006) English; Dark Age Britain
Susan E. Alcock (born 19??) American; Roman provinces
Miranda Aldhouse-Green (born 1947) British; British Iron Age and Romano-Celtic
Abbas Alizadeh (born 1951) Iranian; Iran
Jim Allen, (born 19??) Australian;  Australia, South Pacific, Port Essington, Lapita, Polynesian
Penelope Allison (born 19??) household and Roman archaeology
Sedat Alp (1913–2006) Turkish; Hittitology
Ruth Amiran (1915–2005) Israeli; Tel Arad
Atholl Anderson (born 1943) New Zealand; New Zealand and the Pacific
David G. Anderson (born 1949) U.S.; eastern North America
Johan Gunnar Andersson (1874–1960) Swedish; China
E. Wyllys Andrews IV (1916–1971) American; Maya

E. Wyllys Andrews V (born 194?) American; Maya 

Manolis Andronicos (1919–1992) Greek; Greece
Mikhail Artamonov (1898–1972) Russian/Soviet; Khazar (Central Asia)
Khaled al-Asaad (1934–2015) Syrian; Palmyra
Mick Aston (1946–2013) English; popularizer
Richard J. C. Atkinson (1920–1994) English; England
Val Attenbrow (born 1942) Australian;  Aboriginal stone tools, archaeology of aboriginal Sydney
Frédérique Audoin-Rouzeau (born 1957) French; Black Death/bubonic plague
Anthony Aveni (born 1938) U.S.; archaeoastronomy
Nahman Avigad (1905–1992) Israeli; Jerusalem, Massada
Hasan Awad (born 1912/13) Bedouin; excavator
Massoud Azarnoush (1946–2008) Iranian; Sassanid archaeology

B
Churchill Babington (1821–1889) English; classical archaeology
Paul Bahn (born 1953) English; prehistoric art (rock art), Easter Island
Geoff Bailey (born 19??) English; paleo-economy, shell middens, coastal archaeology, Greece
Adolph Francis Alphonse Bandelier (1840–1914) American; American South-West, Mexico
Rakhaldas Bandyopadhyay (1885–1930) Indian; Mohenjo-daro, Harappa culture
Ranuccio Bianchi Bandinelli (1900–1975) Italian; Etruscans & art
Edward B. Banning (born 19??) Canadian; Near Eastern archaeology, archaeological survey
Luisa Banti (1894–1978) Italian; Etruscology
Taha Baqir (1912–1984) Iraqi; deciphered Sumero-Akkadian mathematical tablets, Akkadian law code discoveries, Babylonia, Sumerian sites
Pessah Bar-Adon (1907–1985) Israeli; Israel (Bet Shearim, Tel Bet Yerah, Nahal Mishmar hoard)
John C. Barrett (born 19??) British; archaeological theory and European prehistory
Diane Barwick (1938–1986) Australian; Aboriginal culture and society
Gabriel Barkay (born 1944) Israeli; Israel (Jerusalem, burials, art, epigraphy, glyptics in the Iron Age, Ketef Hinnom)
Graeme Barker (born 1946) British; Italian Bronze Age, Roman Libya, landscape archaeology
Philip Barker (1920–2001) British; excavation methods, historic England
Ofer Bar-Yosef (1937–2020) Israeli; Palaeolithic and Neolithic sites
George Bass (1932–2021) American; underwater archaeology
Thomas Bateman (1821–1861) English; England (Derbyshire)
Leopoldo Batres (1852–1926) Mexican; Meso-America (Teotihuacan, Monte Albán, Mitla La Quemada, Xochicalco)
Gertrude Bell (1868–1926) English; adventurer and Middle Eastern archaeologist, formed the Baghdad Archaeological Museum (now Iraqi Museum)
Peter Bellwood (born 1943) Australian; Southeast Asia and the Pacific; origins of agriculture and resulting cultural, linguistic and biological developments (worldwide)| interdisciplinary connections between archaeology, linguistics and human biology
Giovanni Battista Belzoni (1778–1823) Italian/Venetian; Egypt
Mary Beaudry (1950–2020) American; eastern U.S., Scotland, Caribbean, gastronomy
Sergei Beletzkiy (1953–2022) Russian; Medieval Russia
Anna Belfer-Cohen (born 1949); Israeli; Upper Palaeolithic and Epipalaeolithic Levant
Erez Ben-Yosef (born 19??); Israeli; archaeometallurgist;
Crystal Bennett (1918–1987) British; Jordan
James Theodore Bent (1852–1897) British;  eastern Med, Africa, and Arabia. 
Dumitru Berciu (1907–1998) Romanian; South-Eastern and Central Europe, Geto-Dacians, Thracians and Celts
Lee Berger (born 1965) U.S.; paleo-anthropology
Gerhard Bersu (1889–1964) German; Europe (England etc.)
Charles Ernest Beule (1826–1874) French; Greece
Paolo Biagi (born 1948) Italian; Eurasian Mesolithic and Neolithic, Pakistan prehistory
Geoffrey Bibby (1917–2001) British; Arabia
Penny Bickle (born 19??) British; bioarchaeology, Neolithic
Clarence Bicknell (1842–1918) British; cataloged petroglyphs at Vallée des Merveilles, France
Martin Biddle (born 1937) British; medieval and post-medieval archaeology in Great Britain
Manfred Bietak (born 1940) Austrian; Egypt
Fereidoun Biglari (born 1970) Iranian Kurdish; Paleolithic
Lewis Binford (1930–2011) American; U.S., France, theory
Hiram Bingham (1875–1956) U.S.; discovered Machu Picchu
Flavio Biondo (1392–1463) Italian; Rome
Avraham Biran (1909–2008) Israeli; Near East (Israel (Tel Dan))
Caroline Bird (born 19??) Australia;  heritage and indigenous studies research
Judy Birmingham (born 19??) Australian; historical archaeology in Australia, Irrawang pottery, Tasmania
Glenn Albert Black (1900–1964) U.S.; US Mid-West
Carl Blegen (1888–1971) U.S.; Troy
Elizabeth Blegen (1888–1966) U.S.; Greece, educator
Frederick Jones Bliss (1857–1939) U.S.; Palestine
Bayar Dovdoi (1946–2010) Mongolian; Mongolia
John Boardman (born 1927) British; Classical archaeology, especially Greek architecture
Nicole Boivin (born 19??) Canadian; migration out of Africa, long-distance maritime trade
Jean Boisselier (1912–1996) French; Khmer, Southeast Asia
Larissa Bonfante (1931–2019) U.S.; Etruscans
Giacomo Boni (1859–1925) Italian; Roman architecture
 Ludwig Borchardt(1863-1938) German; Egypt (Amarna)
François Bordes (1919–1981) French; paleolithic, typology, knapping
Barbara Borg (born 1960) German; Classical archaeology

Stephen Borhegyi (1921–1969) American; Meso-America
Jacques Boucher de Crèvecœur de Perthes (1788–1868) French; France
Stephen Bourke, Australian; Pella
Jole Bovio Marconi (1897–1986) Italian; Neolithic Sicily
Sandra Bowdler (born 1947) Australian; Australian Indigenous archaeology, pre-neolithic East and Southeast Asia
Harriet Boyd Hawes (1871–1945) American; Greece & Crete; Minoan 
Harry Charles Purvis Bell (1851–1937) British civil servant; first Commissioner of Archaeology in Ceylon ;  
Richard Bradley (born 1946) British; prehistoric Europe (especially Britain)
Linda Schreiber Braidwood (1909–2003) U.S.; Near East
Senake Bandaranayake (1938 –2015) Sri Lanka; archeologist, Emeritus professor and vice chancellor at University of Kelaniya 
Robert John Braidwood (1907–2003) U.S.; Turkey

Charles Etienne Brasseur de Bourbourg (1814–1874) French; Meso-America
James Henry Breasted (1865–1935) U.S.; Egypt
Adela Breton (1849–1923) British; Mexico
Eric Breuer (born 1968) Swiss; Roman/Medieval chronology
Jacques Breuer (born 1956) Belgian; Roman and Merovingian Belgium
Robert Brier (born 1943) U.S.; Egypt paleopathology
Patrick M.M.A. Bringmans (born 1970) Belgian; Palaeolithic Archaeology & Paleoanthropology
Srečko Brodar (1893–1987) Slovene; Upper Paleolithic
Mary Brodrick (c. 1858–1933) English; Egyptology
Alison S. Brooks (born 19??) American; Paleolithic, particularly the Middle Stone Age of Africa
Myrtle Florence Broome (c. 1888–1978) English; Egyptology, illustrator
Don Brothwell (1933–2016) British; paleopathology
Frank Edward Brown (1908–1988) American; Mediterranean  
Elizabeth Brumfiel (1945–2012) U.S.; Mesoamerica
Caitlin E. Buck (born 1964) British; statistics, radiocarbon dating.
Sue Bulmer (1933–2016) American; New Zealand, Papua New Guinea
Hallie Buckley (born 19??) New Zealand; bioarchaeology
Heather Burke (born 19??) Australian; historical archaeology, field methods
Aubrey Burl (1926–2020) British; British megalithic monuments
Les Bursill (1945–2019) Australian; Dharawal people, Sutherland Shire, Illawarra
Karl Butzer (1934–2016) U.S.; environmental archaeology

C
Errett Callahan (1937–2019) American; experimental archaeology
Frank Calvert (1828–1908) English; Troy
Raissa Calza (1894–1979) Ukrainian; Italy (Ostia)
Elizabeth Warder Crozer Campbell (1893–1971) American; California
Scott Cane (born 1954) Australian; Australia, desert people of Australia
Luigi Canina (1795–1856) Italian; Italy (Tusculum, Appian Way)
Gheorghe I. Cantacuzino (1937–2019) Romanian; Romania
Bob Carr (born 1947) American; Florida historic Indians
Maureen Carroll (born 1953) British; Roman archaeology
Martin Carver (born 1941) British; Early Middle Ages in Northern Europe, Sutton Hoo
Howard Carter (1874–1939) English; Egypt
Alfonso Caso (1896–1970) Mexican; Mexico
C. W. Ceram (1915–1972) German; popularizer
Dilip Chakrabarti (born 1941) Indian; South Asia (Ganges Plain)
John Leland Champe (1895–1978) American?; archaeology of the Great Plains
Jean-François Champollion (1790–1832) French; Egypt
Kwang-chih Chang (1931–2001) Chinese/Taiwanese; China
Doris Emerson Chapman (1903–1990) British; prehistory
Arlen F. Chase (born 1953) American; Mesoamerica
Diane Zaino Chase (born 1953) American; Mesoamerica
George Henry Chase (1874–1952) American; Heraion of Argos
Alfredo Chavero (1841–1906) Mexican; Mexico
Chen Mengjia (1911–1966) Chinese; China
Chen Tiemei (1935–2018) Chinese; scientific archaeology and radiocarbon dating
Chen Xingcan(born 1964) Chinese; China, history of Chinese archaeology
John F. Cherry (born 19??) Welsh; Aegean prehistory
Vere Gordon Childe (1892–1957) Australian; Europe / neolithic
Choi Mong-lyong (born 1946) Korean; Korea (Mumin pottery period)
Neil Christie (born 19??) British; Late Antiquity and the Middle Ages
Leopoldo Cicognara (1767–1834) Italian; Italy
Muazzez İlmiye Çığ (born 1914) Turkish; Sumerology
Jacques Cinq-Mars (died 2021) Canadian; Yukon, early man in North America

Amanda Claridge (1949–2022) British; Rome

John Desmond Clark (1916–2002) English; Africa
Grahame Clark (1907–1995) British; Mesolith and economy
Kate Clark (19??) industrial archaeology and museum
Bob Clarke (Historian) (born 1964) English; Prehistoric and Modern Era
David Clarke (1937–1976) English; theory
Stephen Clarke (born 19??) Welsh; Wales
Albert Tobias Clay (1866–1925) American; Assyriology
John Clegg (1935–2015) Australian; rock art
Eric H. Cline (born 1960) American?; Ancient Near East, Aegean prehistory
Fay-Cooper Cole (1881–1961) American; U.S. Mid-West
Bryony Coles (born 1946) British; prehistoric archaeology, wetland archaeology, Somerset Levels, Doggerland
John Coles (1930–2020) British; wetland archaeology, Bronze Age, experimental archaeology
Donald Collier (1911–1995) American; Ecuadorian and Andean archaeology
John Collis (born 1944) English; Iron Age Europe
Dominique Collon (born 1940) Belgian; cylinder seals of the Near East
Sir Richard Colt Hoare (1758–1838) English, England
Margaret Conkey (born 1943) American; Upper Paleolithic France
Robin Coningham (born 1965) British; South Asian archaeology and archaeological ethics
Diane Atnally Conlin (born 1963) American; Roman art and architecture
Niculae Conovici (1948–2005) Romanian; Romania, amphorae
Graham Connah (born 1934) South Africa; historical archaeology

Richard Cooke (1946 - 2023) British?; Panama, archaeozoology
Gudrun Corvinus (1931–2006) German; India/Nepal/Africa
Peter Coutts (born 1934) Australian; historical archaeology
George Cowgill (1929–2018) American; Mesoamerica (Teotihuacan)
O.G.S. Crawford (1886–1957) English; aerial archaeology
Roger Cribb (1948–2007) Australian; Turkish Kurds and Australian Aborigines
Ion Horaţiu Crişan (1928–1994)Romanian; Geto-Dacians and Celts
William (Bill) Culican (1928–1984) Australian; Middle East, Australian historical archaeology
Joseph George Cumming (1812–1868) English; Isle of Man
Barry Cunliffe (born 1939) British; Iron Age Europe, Celts
Ben Cunnington (1861–1950) English; prehistoric England (Wiltshire)
Alexander Cunningham (1814–1893) English; "Father of Indian Archaeology"
Maud Cunnington (1869–1951) Welsh; prehistoric Britain (Salisbury Plain)
William Cunnington (1754–1810) English; prehistoric Britain (Salisbury Plain)
James Curle (1861?–1944) Scottish; Roman Scotland (Trimontium), Gotland
Florin Curta (born 1965) American; Eastern Europe
Ernst Curtius (1814–1896) German; Greece
Clive Eric Cussler (1931–2020) American; underwater archaeology

D
Gaetano d'Ancora (1751–1816) Italy
Albéric d'Auxy (1836–1914) Belgian; Belgium
Bruno Dagens (born 1935) French; Khmer and India
Constantin Daicoviciu (1898–1973) Romanian; Romania
Don Martino de Zilva Wickremasinghe (1865–1937) An epigraphist and archaeologist ; Sri Lanka
Paulus Edward Pieris Deraniyagala (1900–1976) Sri Lankan paleontologist, zoologist;  director of the National Museum of Ceylon from 1961 to 1964
George F. Dales (1927–1992) American; Nippur, Indus valley civilizations
Ahmad Hasan Dani (1920–2009) Pakistani; South Asian archaeology
Glyn Daniel (1914–1986) Welsh; European Neolithic; popularization of archaeology
Ken Dark (born 1961) British; Roman Europe
Raymond Dart (1893–1988) Australian; paleoanthropology:  Australopithecus africanus
Siran Upendra Deraniyagala (1942 –2021) Sri Lankan archaeologist and historian, who served as the Director-General of Archaeology in the Department of Archaeology of Sri Lanka from 1992 to 2001. 
Janet Davidson (born 19?) New Zealand; New Zealand, Pacific Islands
Theodore M. Davis (1837–1915) American; Egypt
William Boyd Dawkins (1837–1929) British; antiquity of man
Touraj Daryaee (born 1967) Iranian; ancient Persia (Iran)
Janette Deacon (born 1939) South African; rock art, heritage management
Hilary Deacon (1936–2010) South African; African; antiquity of man
Corinne Debaine-Francfort (born 19??) French; Eastern Central Asian and protohistoric China
James Deetz (1930–2000) American; Historical Archaeology
Warren DeBoer (died May 24, 2020) American; North and South America, ethnoarchaeology; ceramics 
James P. Delgado (born 1958) American; maritime archaeologist
Robin Dennell (born 1947) British; prehistoric archaeologist
Donald Brian Doe (1920–2005) British; Arabia
Louis Felicien de Saulcy (1807–1880) French; Holy Land
Jules Desnoyers (1800–1887) French; antiquity of man
Rúaidhrí de Valera (1916–1978) Irish; megalithic tombs in Ireland
Dragotin Dežman (1821–1889) Slovenian; Ljubljana Marsh, Iron Age in Lower Carniola
Adolphe Napoleon Didron (1806–1867) French; Medievalist, Christian iconography
Tom D. Dillehay (born 19??) American-Chilean; ethnoarchaeologist, early occupation of the Americas
Kelly Dixon (born 19??) American; historical archaeology of the American West
Brian Dobson (1931–2012) British; Hadrian's Wall, the Roman Army
Dong Zuobin (1895–1963) Chinese/Taiwanese; oracle bones, Yinxu
Gertrud Dorka (1893–1976), German archaeologist, prehistorian and museum director
Wilhelm Dörpfeld (1853–1940) German; Greece
Trude Dothan (1922–2016) Austrian; Israel
Hans Dragendorff (1870–1941) German; Roman ceramics
Penelope Dransart (born 19??) British?; South American anthropology
Carol van Driel-Murray (born 1950) British; gender archaeology, Roman archaeology, and leather
Angela von den Driesch (1934–2012) German; osteoarchaeology
Hilary du Cros (born 19??) Australian; history of Australian archaeology
Duan Qingbo (1964–2019) Chinese; Mausoleum of the First Qin Emperor
Roger Duff (1912–1978) New Zealander; New Zealand
Katherine Dunbabin (born 19??) British?; classical archaeology; Roman art
Robert Dunnell (1947–2010) American; theory, U.S. Mid-West
Louis Dupree (1925–1989) American; Afghanistan
E. C. L. During Caspers (1934–1996) Dutch; Prehistoric Mesopotamia, South Asian, and Persian Gulf
Robert H. Dyson (1927–2020) American; Near Eastern archaeology

E
Elizabeth Eames (1918–2008) British; specialist in English medieval tiles
Hella Eckardt (born 19??) Roman archaeology; material culture
Campbell Cowan Edgar (1870–1938)  British; Cyclades and Hellenistic Egypt, papyrology specialist
Amelia Edwards (1831–1892) British; Egypt
Ricardo Eichmann (born 1955) German; Near Eastern archaeology
George Eogan (1930–2021) Irish; Knowth (Ireland)
Kenan Erim (1929–1990) Turkish; Hellenistic Anatolia
Ufuk Esin (1933–2008) Turkish; prehistoric Anatolia, archaeometry
Roland Étienne (born 1944) French; ancient Greece and Hellenistic period
Sir Arthur Evans (1851–1941) British; Aegean archaeology (Minoan studies, Knossos, Linear A and B)
Sir John Evans (1823–1908) English; British archaeology

F
Georg Fabricius (1516–1571) German; Roman epigraphy
Brian M. Fagan (born 1936) British; generalist, popularist, history of archaeology
Panagiotis Faklaris (born 1950) Greek; classical archaeology, excavator of Vergina
Fan Jinshi (born 1938) Chinese; Dunhuang
William Fash (born 1954) American; Maya
Charles H. Faulkner (1937–2022) American; Tennessee, historic archaeology
Neil Faulkner (1958-2022) British; Norfolk, Jordan
Rev. Bryan Faussett (1720–1776) English; Anglo-Saxon Kent (England)
Carlo Fea (1753–1836) Italian; Roman archaeology, archaeological law
Gary M. Feinman (born 1951) American; Mesoamerica, Oaxaca
Sir Charles Fellows (1799–1860) British; Asia Minor
Karl Ludwig Fernow (1763–1808) German; Roman archaeology
J. Walter Fewkes (1850–1930) American; south-west USA (Hohokam; Pueblo, pottery)*
Irving Finkel (born 1951) British;  cuneiform tablets
Israel Finkelstein (born 1949) Israeli; Bronze Age & Iron Age in Israel, Megiddo (Israel)
George R. Fischer (1937–2016) American; underwater archaeology
Peter M. Fischer (born 19??) Austrian-Swedish; Eastern Mediterranean, Near East
Cleo Rickman Fitch (1910–1995) American; Roman archaeology
William W. Fitzhugh (born 1943) American; circumpolar archaeology
Kent Flannery (born 1934) American; Mesoamerica
Josephine Flood (born 1938) Australian; Aboriginal prehistory of the Australia Cloggs Cave
Robert Bruce Foote (1834 – 1912) British; India:  "the father of Indian prehistory"
Adam Ford (born 19??) Australian; host of documentary series Who's Been Sleeping in My House?
James A. Ford (1911–1968) American; Southeastern United States
Sally Foster (born 19??) Scottish; Medieval Scotland
Alfred Foucher (1865–1952) French; Afghanistan (Gandahar art) & southern Africa
Aileen Fox (1907–2005) British; South West England
Cyril Fox (1882–1967) English; Wales
William Flinders Petrie (1853–1942) English; Egyptology, methodology
David Frankel (born 19??) Australian; Cyprus, Syria, Koongine Cave (Australia) 
Barry L. Frankhauser (1943–2014) Australian; archaeometry, residue analysis, Maori earth ovens, sourcing Australian ochres 
Elizabeth French (1931–2021) British; Mycenaean Greece, especially the site of Mycenae, and Mycenaean terracottas
George Frison (1924–2020) American; Paleoindian archaeology, lithic tools, pale-oarchaeology
Gayle J. Fritz (born 19??) American; paleo-ethnobotany, agriculture in North America
Honor Frost (1924–2010) British; maritime archaeology, Mediterranean, stone anchors
Dorian Fuller (born 19??) American; archaeobotany, domestication

G
Charles Godakumbura (1907–1977 ) Commissioner of Archaeology in Ceylon (Sri Lanka) from 1956 to 1967.; 
Christopher Gaffney (born 1962) British; geophysics
Vincent Gaffney (born 1958) British; landscape archaeology
Lamia Al-Gailani Werr (1938–2019) Iraqi; Mesopotamian archaeology
Antoine Galland (1646–1715) French; numismatics, Middle East
Thomas Gann (1867–1938) Irish; Mesoamerica, Maya
Sandor (Alexander) Gallus (1907–1996) Australian; Pleistocene Aboriginal occupation Koonalda Cave South Australia Dry Creek archaeological site Keilor
Jean-Claude Gardin (1925–2013) French; Bactria, theory in archaeology, computing in archaeology
Andrew Gardner (born 19??) Roman archaeology
Percy Gardner (1846–1937) English; classical archaeology
Dorothy Garrod (1892–1968) British; paleolithic
Yosef Garfinkel (born 1956) Israeli; Israel
Peter Garlake (1934–2011) Zimbabwean; Zimbabwe
John Garstang (1876–1954) British; Anatolia, Southern Levant
Kathleen O'Neal Gear (born 1954) American; US West; archaeological fiction
William Gell (1777–1836) English; Classical archaeology
Friedrich William Eduard Gerhard (1795–1867) German; Rome
Diane Gifford-Gonzalez (born 19??) zooarchaeology
John Wesley Gilbert (1864–1923) first African-American archaeologist; Classical
Marija Gimbutas (1921–1994) Lithuanian-American; Neolithic & Bronze Age
Pere Bosch-Gimpera (1891–1974) Spanish-Mexican; prehistoric Spain
Einar Gjerstad (1897–1988) Swedish; Cyprus and Rome
Kathryn Gleason (born 1957) American; Specialist in the archaeology of landscape architecture
John Mann Goggin (1916–1963) American; typology, colonial Caribbean
Albert Glock (1925–1992) American; Palestinian archaeology
Franck Goddio (born 1947) French; underwater archaeology, Heracleion (Egypt)
Lynne Goldstein (born 1953) American; prehistoric eastern North America, mortuary
Jack Golson (born 1926) Australian; Melanesia, Polynesia and Micronesia Savai'i island, Samoa
Albert Goodyear (born 19??) American; Paleo-Indians
Alice Gorman (born 1964) Australian; Space archaeology, contemporary archaeology, Indigenous Australian archaeology, stone tools, orbital debris, space as a cultural landscape
 Carlos J. Gradin (1918–2002) Argentine; Patagonian Paleo-Indians
Ian Graham (1923–2017) British; Mayans
Boris Grakov (1899–1970) Soviet/Russian; Scythians and Sarmatians
Elizabeth Caroline Gray (1800–1887) Italy; Etruscans
Roger Green (1932–2009) American; New Zealand, Pacific Islands
Kevin Greene (born 19??) British; classical archaeology
J. Patrick Greene (born 19??) British; Medieval England
Canon William Greenwell (1820–1918) British; Neolithic England
Alan Greaves (born 1969) British; Turkey
James Bennett Griffin (1905–1997) American; prehistoric eastern North America
W. F. Grimes (1905–1988) Welsh; London
Klaus Grote (born 1947) German; Lower Saxony (Germany)
Nikolai Grube (born 1962) German; Mayan epigraphy
Raimondo Guarini (1765–1852) Italian; Classical
Prishantha Gunawardena (born 1968) Sri Lankan; Sri Lanka
Guo Moruo (1892–1978) Chinese; China
Gustaf VI Adolf of Sweden (1882–1973) Swedish; Classical

H
Joseph Hackin (1886–1941) French; Afghanistan
Marie Hackin (1905–1941) French; Afghanistan
Robert Hall (1927–2012) American; U.S. Mid-West
Abdulameer al-Hamdani (1967–2022) Iraqi; Iraq, digital database, artifact rescue
Osman Hamdi Bey (1842–1911) Ottoman Turkish; Syria and Lebanon
Robert Hamilton (1905–1995) British; Near Eastern archaeology
Norman Hammond (born 1944) British; Afghanistan, Maya
Richard D. Hansen (born 19??) American; Meso-America
Alexander Hardcastle (1872–1933)  English; Agrigento, Sicily
Anthony Harding (born 1946) British; Bronze Age Europe
Phil Harding (born 1950) British; Britain, flint-knapping
James Penrose Harland (1891–1973) American; Aegean
J.C. "Pinky" Harrington (1901–1998) American; U.S. historical archaeology
Emil Haury (1904–1992) American; Southwestern United States
Zahi Hawass (born 1947) Egyptian; Egypt
Christopher Hawkes (1905–1992) English; European archaeology
Jacquetta Hawkes (1910–1996) English; prehistory of England, Europe, Minoa
Sonia Chadwick Hawkes (1933–1999) English; European archaeology, early medieval archaeology
Lotte Hedeager (born 1948) Danish; Iron Age Scandinavia
Jakob Heierli (1853–1912) Swiss; prehistoric Switzerland
Robert Heizer (1915–1979) American; California
Hans Helbæk (1907–1981) Danish; palaeobotany
John Basil Hennessy (1925-2013) Australian; Near East 
Edgar Lee Hewett (1865–1946) American; U.S. South-West, antiquities law
Christian Gottlob Heyne (1729–1812) Saxon-German; classics
Eric Higgs (1908–1976) English; economic archaeology
Charles Higham (born 1939) British; South East Asia
Thomas Higham (born 19??) New Zealand; radiocarbon dating
Bert Hodge Hill (1874–1958) American; classical archaeology
Ida Hill (1875–1958) American; classical archaeology
Bert Hodge Hill (1874–1958) American; classical archaeology
Gordon Hillman (1943–2018) British; archaeobotany
Peter Hinton (born 19??) British; England
Yizhar Hirschfeld (1950–2006) Israeli; Israel (Ramat HaNadiv, Qumran)
Peter Hiscock (born 1957) Australian; ancient technology 
Ian Hodder (born 1948) English; theory, Catalhoyuk 
Frederick Webb Hodge (1864–1956) American; North American Indians
Richard Hodges (born 1952) British; Middle Ages
Birgitta Hoffmann (born 1969); Gask Ridge
Michael A. Hoffman (1944–1990) American; Egyptology
Alexander Hubert Arthur Hogg (1908–1989) British; hillforts
Frank Hole (born 1931) American; Near East
Vance T. Holliday (born 1950)  American?; Paleoindian and Great Plains geoarchaeology and archaeology
Mads Kähler Holst (born 1973) Danish; Bronze Age and Iron Age wetland sites in Denmark
Sinclar Hood (1917–2021) British; Knossos 
Jeannette Hope, Australian; Western New Sohttps://www.theguardian.com/science/2015/oct/07/juliet-clutton-brockuth Wales
John Horsley (1685–1732) British; Roman Britain
Youssef Hourany (1931–2019) Lebanese; Middle East
Huang Wenbi (1893–1966) Chinese; China
Huang Zhanyue (1926–2019) Chinese; China from the Han dynasty to the Tang dynasty
John Hurst (1927–2003) British; English medieval archaeology
Elinor Mullett Husselman (1900–1996) American; Coptic historian, papyrologist
Juliet Hutton-Brock (1933–2015) British; archaeozoology

I
Richard Indreko (1900–1961) Estonian; Estonia
Cynthia Irwin-Williams (1936–1990) American; Southwestern archaeology
Glynn Isaac (1937–1985) South African; African paleoanthropology
Hideshi Ishikawa (born 1954) Japanese; Japanese and Korean archaeology
Fumiko Ikawa-Smith (born 1930) Japanese-Canadian; East Asian and Japanese archaeology

J
Roger Jacobi (1947–2009) British; Palaeolithic and Mesolithic Britain
Otto Jahn (1813–1869) German; classical world (art)
Jean-François Jarrige (1940–2014) French; South Asia
Jacques Jaubert (born 1957) French; lower and middle Paleolithic, lithic technology
Thomas Jefferson (1743–1826) U.S. President; Virginia prehistory
Arthur J. Jelinek (1928–2022) American; Eurasian Paleolithic
Jesse D. Jennings (1909–1997) American; New World
Llewellyn Jewitt (1816–1886) English; British antiquities
Donald Johanson (born 1943) American; paleoanthropology, Ethiopia
Jotham Johnson (1905–1967) American; Minturno (Italy), past president of the Archaeological Institute of America
Margaret Ursula Jones (1916–2001) British; Mucking,  England
Rebecca Jones (born 19??) British; Roman Britain
Rhys Maengwyn Jones (1941–2001) Welsh/Australian; Tasmania
Martha Joukowsky (1936-2022) American; Middle East (Petra), field methods
Chris Judge (born 19??) American; eastern U.S. (Woodland, Mississippian)
Elsie Jury (1910–1993) Canadian; historical archaeology of Ontario

K
Lili Kaelas (1919–2007) Swedish; Stone and Bronze Age
Gilbert Kaenel (1949–2020) Swiss; Iron Age, La Tène culture
Seifollah Kambakhshfard  (1929–2010) Iranian; Iron Age Temple of Anahita 
Johan Kamminga (born 19??); University of Sydney; use-wear and residues
Simon Keay (1954-2021) English; Roman Portus, surveys of Roman Spain and Italy
Phoebe Keef (1898–1978) British; prehistoric archaeology, Sussex
Bennie Carlton Keel (born 1934) American; Southeastern archaeology, Public Archaeology, Cherokee archaeology
Alice Beck Kehoe  (born 1934) American; North America: early contact
Eduard von Kallee (1818–1888) German; Germany: found 4 Roman castra on the Limes Germanicus
Richard Kallee (1854–1933) German; studied 102 Alemannic tombs
J. Charles Kelley (1913–1997) American; north-west Mexico
Arthur Randolph Kelly (1900–1979) American; Southeastern USA
Robert Laurens Kelly (born 1957) American; Western USA
 Francis Kelsey (1858–1927) American; Middle East, papyrology 
David L. Kennedy (born 1948) British and Australian; Roman Near East
Jonathan Mark Kenoyer (born 1952) American; Indus Valley Civilization
Kathleen Kenyon (1906–1978) English; Britain, Near East (Jericho)
Alfred V. Kidder (1885–1963) American; southwestern USA, Mesoamerica
T. R. Kidder (born 1960) American; geoarchaeology and archaeology of Southeastern United States
Keith Kintigh (born 19??) American; quantitative archaeology, Southwestern archaeology
Kristian Kristiansen (born 1948) Danish; Bronze Age Europe, heritage studies, archaeological theory
Kim Won-yong (1922–1993) (south) Korean; Korea
Athanasius Kircher (1602–1680) German; Egyptian hieroglyphics ("the father of Egyptology")
Richard Klein (born 1941) American; paleo-anthropology (Africa, Europe)
Amos Kloner (1940–2019) Israeli; Talpiot Tomb (Israel), Hellenistic, Roman and Byzantine archaeology
Sir Francis Knowles, 5th Baronet (1886–1953) English; anthropology and prehistory
Alice Kober (1906–1950) American; Linear B
Robert Koldewey (1855–1925) German; Near East (Babylon)
Manfred Korfmann (1942–2005) German; Bronze Age Aegean and Anatolia (Troy)
 Paul Kosok (1896–1959) American; Nazca geoglyphs
Gustaf Kossinna (1858–1931) German; Germany (Neolithic, Aryan concept)
Hamit Zübeyir Koşay (1897–1984) Turkish; Early Bronze Age Anatolia
Raiko Krauss (born 1973) German; prehistory
Pasko Kuzman (born 1947) Macedonian; Ohrid, North Macedonia

L
Robert Laffineur Belgian; Mycenaeanologist
 B. B. Lal (1921-2022) Indian; India
Dorothy Lamb (1887–1967) British; classical archaeology
Luigi Lanzi (1732–1810) Italian; Etruscans
Nancy Lapp (born 1930) American; Near Eastern archaeology, biblical archaeology
Pierre Henri Larcher (1726–1812) French; classical archaeology
Donald Lathrap (1927–1990) American; South America, U.S. Mid-West
Jean-Philippe Lauer (1902–2001) French; Egypt
Bo Lawergren (born 19??)  American?;  music archaeology; Mesopotamia
T. E. Lawrence (1888–1935) British; adventurer, Middle East
Sir Austen Henry Layard (1817–1894) British; Middle East (Kuyunjik and Nimrud)
Estelle Lazer (born 19??) Australian; human skeletal remains discovered at Pompeii
Foss Leach (born 1942) New Zealand; New Zealand
Louis Leakey (1903–1972) British; archaeologist and paleoanthropologist, Africa
Mary Leakey (1913–1996) British; archaeologist and paleoanthropologist, Africa
Richard Leakey (1944–2022) Kenyan; paleoanthropology, Africa
Edward Thurlow Leeds (1877–1955) British; Keeper of the Ashmolean Museum 19281945
Charles Lenormant (1802–1859) French; Egypt, Greece, Middle East
François Lenormant (1837–1883) French; Assyriologist
Mark P. Leone (born 1940) American; theory, historical archaeology
Dana Lepofsky (born 1958) Canadian; paleoethnobotany, Northwest Coast
André Leroi-Gourhan (1911–1986) French; theory, art, Paleolithic
Jean Antoine Letronne (1787–1848) French; Greece, Rome, Egypt
Gerson Levi-Lazzaris (born 1979) Brazilian; ethnoarchaeology
Carenza Lewis (born 1963) British; popularizer; Medieval Britain
Jodie Lewis (born 19??) British; prehistoric archaeology
Madeline Kneberg Lewis (1901–1996) American; typologist, Illustrator.
Mary Lewis (born 19??) British; bioarchaeologist
David Lewis-Williams (born 1934) South African;cognitive archaeology, Upper-Palaeolithic and Bushmen rock art
Edward Lhuyd (1660–1709) Welsh; Britain
Li Feng (born 1962) Chinese/American; early China
Li Ji (Li Chi, 1896–1979) Chinese; Yinxu and Yangshao culture
Li Xueqin (1933–2019) Chinese; early China
Mary Aiken Littauer (1912–2005) American; horses in pre-history
Li Liu (born 1953) Chinese/American; neolithic and Bronze Age China, "the father of Chinese archaeology"
Gary Lock (born 19??) British; computational archaeology, European prehistory
Georg Loeschcke (1852–1915) German; Mycenaean pottery
Helen Loney (born 19??) prehistoric archaeology and pottery studies
Samuel Kirkland Lothrop (1892–1965) American; Central and South America and the Caribbean
Victor Loret (1859–1946) French; Egypt & Southern Africa
William A. Longacre (1937–2015) American; southwestern USA, "New Archaeology 
Harry Lourandos (born 1945) Australian; hunter-gatherer intensification
Sir John Lubbock (1834–1913) English; terminology, evolution, generalist
Rev. William Collings Lukis (1817–1892) British; megaliths of Great Britain and France
Cajsa S. Lund (sv) (born 1940) Swedish; music archaeology 
Frances Lynch (born 19??) Welsh; Wales
Albert Lythgoe (1868–1934) American; Egyptologist and a curator at the Metropolitan Museum of Art

M
Ma Chengyuan (1927–2004) Chinese; authority on ancient Chinese bronzes
Robert Alexander Stewart Macalister (1870–1950) Irish; Palestine, Celtic archaeology
Burton MacDonald (born 1939) Canadian; biblical archaeology
Eve MacDonald (born 19??) classical archaeologist
John MacEnery (1797–1841) Irish; Paleolithic
Richard MacNeish (1918–2001) American; Canada, Iroquois (U.S./Canada), Meso-America, discovered origins of maize
Aren Maeir (born 1958) Israeli; Ancient Levant, Israel, Philistines
Mai Yinghao (1929–2016) Chinese; archaeology of the Nanyue kingdom in Guangzhou
Aren Maeir (born 1958) Israeli; Ancient Levant, Israel, Philistines
Yousef Majidzadeh (born 1938) Iranian; Jiroft culture (Iran)
Sadegh Malek Shahmirzadi (1940–2020) Iranian; ancient Persia (Iran)
Alexis Mallon (1875–1934) French; Levantine prehistory
James Patrick Mallory (born 1945) Irish-American; Indo-European origins, proto-Celtic culture
Max Mallowan (1904–1978) British; Middle East
John Manley (born 1952) British; Roman Britain
Joyce Marcus (born 19??) American; Latin America
Auguste-Édouard Mariette (1821–1881) French; Egypt
Spyridon Marinatos (1901–1974) Greek; Greece, Mycenaeans
Alexander Marshack (1918–2004) American; Paleolithic era
Fiona Marshall (born 19??) American;zooarchaeology and ethnoarchaeology
James A. Marshall (died 2006) American; eastern North American earthworks
John Hubert Marshall (1876–1958) British; Indus Valley Civilization, Taxila, Crete
Pamela Marshall (born 19??) buildings archaeologist and castellologist
Marjan Mashkour (born 19??) Iranian; zooarchaeology of Europe and Middle East
J. Alden Mason (1885–1967) American; New World archaeology
Ronald J. Mason (born 1929) Upper Great Lakes
Gaston Maspero (1846–1916) French; Egypt
Therkel Mathiassen (1892–1967) Danish; Arctic region
Peter Mathews (born 1951) Australian; Maya hieroglyphs 
Galina Ivanovna Matveeva (1933–2008) Russian; Central Russia/Volga region
Alfred P. Maudslay (1850–1931) British; Mayans
Valerie Maxfield (born 19??) Roman archaeology
Sally Kate May (born 19??) Australian; indigenous rock art
Amihai Mazar (born 1942) Israeli; Israel, Biblical archaeology
Benjamin Mazar (1906–1995) Israeli; Israel, Biblical archaeology
Eilat Mazar (1956–2021) Israeli; Jerusalem, Phoenicians
Gaby Mazor (born 1944) Israeli; Bet She'an (Israeli)
August Mau (1840–1909) German; Pompeii
Sally McBrearty (born 19??) American; Palaeolithic archaeology
Isabel McBryde (born 1934) Australian; "Mother of Australian Archaeology," axe sourcing studies
Charles McBurney (1914–1979) British; Britain (Upper Paleolithic), Libya, Iran, cave art
 Anna Marguerite McCann (1933 – 2017) American; Underwater Archaeology
Fred McCarthy (1905–1997) Australian; Australia's Aborigines
Aleksandra McClain (born 19??) medieval and church archaeology
Robert McGhee (born 1941) Canadian; Arctic
Betty Meehan (born 1933) Australian; Maningrida, Australia
Vincent Megaw (born 1934) Australian; Early Celtic Art in Britain 
Betty Meggers (1921–2012) American; South America
James Mellaart (1925–2012) British; discoverer of Çatalhöyük
Paul Mellars (1939–2022) British?; Neanderthals, European mesolithic
Michael Mercati (1541–1593) Italian [born in Rome]; lithics
Roger Mercer (1944–2018) British; Neolithic and Bronze Age British Isles
Prosper Mérimée (1803–1870) French; French monuments
Kazimierz Michałowski (1901-1981) Polish; Mediterranean archaeology 
Jerald T. Milanich (born 19??) American; U.S. south-east (Florida)
Walter Minchinton (1921–1996) British; industrial archaeology
Sir Ellis Minns (1874–1953) British; eastern Europe
Keneiloe Molopyane (1987- ) South African
Oscar Montelius (1843–1921) Swedish; seriation, Europe (Scandinavia)
Pierre Montet (1885–1966) French; Lebanon, Egypt (Tanis)
Harri Moora (1900–1968) Estonian; Iron Age Baltics 
Andrew M.T. Moore (born 19??) English; neolithic, Middle East
Clarence Bloomfield Moore (1852–1936) American; southern United States
Warren K. Moorehead (1866–1939) American; prehistoric eastern United States
Robert Morkot (born 1957) Egyptology
Mike Morwood (1950–2013) Australian; Homo floresiensis
Sylvanus G. Morley (1883–1948) American; Mesoamerica, especially Maya
Ann Axtell Morris (1900–1945) American; southwestern U.S. and Mexico
Earl H. Morris (1889-1956) American; southwestern U.S. and Mexico
Dan Morse (born 1935) American; Central Mississippi Valley
Phyllis Morse (Anderson) (born 1934) American; Central Mississippi Valley
John Robert Mortimer (1825–1911) English; England (barrows)
Sabatino Moscati (1922–1997) Italian; Phoenicians
Amini Aza Mturi Tanzanian; Palaeolithic archaeology
Keith Muckelroy (1951–1980) British?; maritime archaeology
David Mullin (b. 19??) prehistoric archaeology
John Mulvaney (1925–2016) Australian; "Father of Australian archaeology"
Ken Mulvaney (born 19??) Australian; Aboriginal engagement, Burrup Peninsula rock art
Stephen Munro (born 19??) Australian; engraved fossil shell from Java
Margaret Murray (1863–1963) Anglo-Indian; Egyptologist
Tim Murray (born 1955) Australian; history of archaeology

Oscar White Muscarella (1931 – 2022) American; Persia, Anatolia

N
 Ramachandran Nagaswamy (1930–2022) Indian; south-Indian statues
Maysoon al-Nahar (born 19??) Jordanian; Palaeoarchaeology of the Southern Levant
Dimitri Nakassis (born 1975) American; Greece
Alma Mekondjo Nankela (born 19??) Namibian; Namibia, rock art
Ezzat Negahban (1926–2009) Iranian; Iran
Sarah Milledge Nelson (1931–2020) American; Korea, Hongshan (China), gender
Ion Nestor (1905–1974) Romanian; Balkans (Sirmium)
Ehud Netzer (1934–2010) Israeli; Israel (Herodian architecture)
René Neuville (1899–1952) French; prehistory of the Southern Levant
Lisa Nevett (born 19??) British; Greece
Charles Thomas Newton (1816–1894) British; Classical archaeology
Constantin S. Nicolăescu-Plopșor (1900–1968) Romania; Romanian prehistory
Christiane Desroches Noblecourt (1913–2011) French; Egypt (Nubian temples)
Francisco Nocete (born 1961) Spanish; Spain
Ivor Noël Hume (1927–2017) British; eastern U.S. seaboard historical archaeology, method and theory of historical archaeology

O
Hugh O'Neill Hencken (1902–1981) American; Iron Age Europe
Kenneth Oakley (1911–1981) English; fluorine dating, exposed Piltdown Man hoax
Jérémie Jacques Oberlin (1735–1806) Alsatian; Biblical archaeology, philology
Alexandru Odobescu (1834–1895) Romanian; history of archaeology
Neil Oliver (born 1967) Scottish; popularizer and television presenter: northern Europe
Akinwumi Ogundiran (born 1966); Nigerian-American archaeologist; Yoruba people; African studies
Katsuhiko Ohnuma (born 1944) Japanese, Lithic expert, flintknapper, prehistorian, (Syria, Iraq, Iran)
Bjørnar Olsen (born 1958) Norwegian; theory, material culture, Arctic
John W. Olsen (born 1955) American; prehistory, Paleolithic, Central Asia
Stanley John Olsen (1919–2003) American; historical archaeology and zooarchaeology
Jocelyn Orchard (1936–2019) British Trinidadian; Near Eastern archaeology, Oman
Tahsin Özgüç (1916–2005) Turkish; Assyria

P
 Athanasios Papageorgiou (1931–2022) Greek Cypriot; Cyprus
Bertha Parker (1907–1978) Abenaki, Seneca; Southwest US archaeology and ethnology
André Parrot (1901–1980) French; ancient Near East
Timothy Pauketat (born 19??) American; Mississippian culture
Vasile Pârvan (1882–1927) Romanian; classical archaeology (Hitria)
Deborah M. Pearsall (born 1950) American; paleo-ethnobotany (phytoliths)
Mike Parker Pearson (born 1957) English; Neolithic British Isles, archaeology of death and burial
Richard J. Pearson (born 1938) Canadian; Pacific
William Pengelly (1812–1894) British; England, paleolithic
Francis Penrose (1817–1903), British; classical
Peter N. Peregrine (born 1963) American; Mississippian culture, cross-cultural studies
Gregory Perino (1914–2005) American; Woodland, and Mississippian cultures in Illinois and Oklahoma
Hilda Petrie (1871–1957) British; Egyptology
William Matthew Flinders Petrie (1853–1942) British; Egypt, methodology, ceramic typology
Stewart Perowne (1901–1989) British; Imadia and Beihan
Alejandro Peschard Fernández (born 19??) Mexican; Meso-America
Philip Phillips (1900–1994) American; theory, eastern and central United States
Alexandre Piankoff (1897–1966) Russian; Egypt
Stuart Piggott (1910–1996) British; neolithic, Europe (especially Britain)
John Pinkerton (1758–1826) Scottish; theory of Gothic superiority, Scottish proto-history
Dolores Piperno (born 1949) American; archaeobotany, maize, Panama
Augustus Pitt Rivers (1827–1900) British; Britain (especially Dorset), method
Nikolaos Platon (1909–1992) Greek; Minoan Crete
Augustus Le Plongeon (1825–1908) British-American; photographer and antiquarian specializing in Pre-Columbian high cultures
Aleks Pluskowski (born 19??) environmental archaeology; medieval Europe
Natalia Polosmak (born 1956) Russian; Siberia: Altay: Pazyryk culture
Cristian Popa (born 19??) Romanian; Coţofeni culture
Rachel Pope (born 19??) British; Iron Age Europe
Reginald Stuart Poole (1832–1895) English; Egypt (hieroglyphics and numismatics)
Gregory Possehl (1941–2011) American; South Asia, Indus Valley Civilization
Timothy W. Potter (1944–2000), British; Classical archaeology
Timothy Potts (born 1958) Australian; Middle East and Mediterranean 
Gary Presland (born 19??) Australian;  Aboriginal landscapes in Victoria
Francis Pryor (born 1945) British; Bronze (Flag Fen, England) and Iron Ages
Senarath Paranavithana (1896–1972) Sri Lankan; Sri Lanka

Q
Jules Etienne Joseph Quicherat (1814–1882) French; ancient Europe

R
Wulf Raeck (born 1950) German; classical archaeology, Pergamon, Greek barbarian portrayals
Philip Rahtz (1921–2011) British; United Kingdom
José Ramos Muñoz (born 19??) Spanish; Europe, northern Africa
Sir Andrew Ramsay (1814–1891) Scottish; Pleistocene geology, stratigraphy
Sir William Mitchell Ramsay (1851–1939) Scottish; Asia Minor and New Testament
Don Ranson (born 19??) Australian; Tasmanian prehistory Kutikina Cave 
Claude Rapin (born 19??) French?; Central Asia
Charles Rau (1826-1887) American; curator at the Smithsonian 
Katharina C. Rebay (born 1977) Austrian; Bronze & Iron Age Central Europe, mortuary analysis, gender
William Rathje (1945–2012) American; early civilizations, modern material culture studies, Mesoamerica
Desire Raoul Rochette (1790–1854) French; Greece
Jean Gaspard Felix Ravaisson-Mollien (1813–1900) French; Classical sculpture
Marion Rawson (1899–1980) American; classical archaeology
Shahrokh Razmjou (born 19??) Iranian; Achaemenid Archaeology
Nicholas Reeves (born 1956) British; Egypt
Ronny Reich (born 1947) Israeli; Jerusalem
Colin Renfrew (born 1937) English; history of language, archaeogenetics
Caspar Reuvens (1793–1835) Dutch; Roman archaeology in the Netherlands
Andrew Reynolds (born 19??) English; Medieval archaeology
Julian C. Richards (born 1951) English; Stonehenge, popularizer
Julian D. Richards (born 19??), British;  Anglo-Saxons, Viking Age
Emil Ritterling (1861–1928) German; archaeology
Anne Strachan Robertson (1910–1997) Scottish; Numismatics
Derek Roe (1937–2014) British; paleolithic
Wil Roebroeks (born 1955) Dutch; The Netherlands
Malcolm J. Rogers (1890–1960) American; California
John Romer (born 1941) British; Egypt, popularizer
Michael Rostovtzeff (1870–1952) Ukrainian/Russian/American; Greece, Thrace, southern Russia
Irving Rouse (1913–2006) American; Caribbean and migration
Katherine Routledge (1866–1935) British; Easter Island
John Howland Rowe (1918–2004) American; Peru
Valentine Roux (born 1956) French; ceramic production in the Levant
Peter Rowley-Conwy (born 1951) British; environmental archaeology
Martin Rundkvist (born 1972) Swedish;  Bronze, Iron, and Middle Ages of Scandinavia.
Adrian Andrei Rusu (born 1951) Romanian; Medieval archaeology, researcher at the Institute of Archaeology and Art History in Cluj-Napoca
Simon Rutar (1851–1903) Slovenian; Slovenia
Alberto Ruz Lhuillier (1906–1979) Mexican; Pre-Columbian Meso-America
Donald P. Ryan (born 1957) American; Egypt (Valley of the Kings)

S
Sadeq, Moain (Mohammedmoin) (born 1955) Palestinian; Palestine and the Gulf region
Saad Abbas Ismail (born 1980) Kurdish; International archaeologist, Syria
Antonio Sagona (1956–2017); Australian; Near East, Caucasus
Sharada Srinivasan (born 1966) Indian; archaeometallurgy, India
Roderick Salisbury (born 1967) American; ideology, soil chemistry, GIS, S.E. Europe (Neolithic)
Viktor Sarianidi (1929–2013) Uzbekistani; Bronze Age, Central Asia
Otto Schaden (1937–2015) American; Egypt
Claude Schaeffer (1898–1982) French; Ugarit
Michael Brian Schiffer (born 1947) American (born in Canada); behavioural archaeology, method and theory
Heinrich Schliemann (1822–1890) German; Troy, Mycenae, Tiryn
Philippe-Charles Schmerling (1790–1836) Belgian; founder of paleontology: antiquity of man
Klaus Schmidt (1953–2014) German; Göbekli Tepe, Turkey
Alain Schnapp (born 1946) French; Classical archaeology: iconography of Greek vases 
Carmel Schrire (born 1941) Australian; Australia, South Africa
Francesco Scipone (1675–1755) Italian; Etruscans
Mercy Seiradaki (1910–1993) English; Knossos
Ovid R. Sellers (1884–1975) American; Biblical Old Testament
Jean Baptiste Louis George Seroux D'Agincourt (1730–1814) French; ancient monumental art
Veronica Seton-Williams (1910–1992) Australian; Egyptology and prehistory, Near East
Thomas Sever (born 19??) American?; NASA’s only archaeologist, Maya, South America
Alireza Shapour Shahbazi (1942–2006) Iranian; Iran
Michael Shanks (born 1959) English; Classical archaeology, theory
Thurstan Shaw (1914–2013) English; Africa (especially Nigeria)
Anna Shepard (1903–1971) American; ceramic analysis
Alison Sheridan (19??) British; Bronze and Neolithic ages
Andrew Sherratt (1946–2006) English; prehistory
Susan Sherratt (born 1949) U.K. citizenship; Mediterranean archaeology
Yoko Shindo (1960–2018), Japanese; Islamic glass
Bong-geun Sim (born 1943) South Korean; Korea
Elizabeth Simpson (born 1947) American; Ancient Near East, Anatolia
Frederic Slater (c. 1880–1947) Australian; Aboriginal place names
Claire Smith (born 1957) Australian;  Indigenous archaeology, rock art
Grafton Elliot Smith (1871–1937) Australian; (anatomist) hyperdiffusionist view of prehistory
William Robertson Smith (1846–1894) Scottish; Orientalist, Biblical scholar
Stanley South (1928–2016) American; historical archaeology
Janet D. Spector (1944–2011) American; North America
Sarah Speight (born 19??) British; castle studies and medieval archaeology
E. Lee Spence (born 1947) American; marine archaeology
Dirk HR Spennemann (born 19??) Australian; futures studies 
Victor Spinei (born 1943) Romanian; medieval cult objects
Flaxman Charles John Spurrell (1842–1915) English; prehistoric England, Egypt
Frederick Spurrell (1824–1902) Rev. English; English archaeology (Essex and Sussex)
Lady Hester Stanhope (1776–1839) British; Ashkelon
Julie K. Stein, (born 19??) American;  geoarchaeology and archaeology of shell middens and coastal archaeological sites
Eunice Stebbens (1893–1992) American; Roman coins
Louise Steel (born 19??) British; prehistoric Cyprus
Paulette Steeves (born 19??) Canadian, Cree, Métis; decolonizing archaeology, Paleo-Indians
Marc Aurel Stein (1862–1943) Hungarian; Central Asia
Hans-Georg Stephan (born 1950) German; Medievalist, post-Medieval archaeology, landscape archaeology, oven tiles
Marion Stirling Pugh (1911–2001) American; Mesopotamian archaeology
James B. Stoltman (1935–2019) American; ceramic analysis, Great Lakes (North America)
James R. Stewart (1913–1962) Australian;  Cyprus and the Ancient Near East 
Joseph Stevens (archaeologist) (1818–1899) British; first curator of Reading Museum
Eugene Stockton (born 1934) Australian; Middle East, Australia
David Stuart (born 1965) American; Mayan epigraphy
George E. Stuart III (1935–2014) American; Mayan archaeology
William Duncan Strong (1899–1962) American; Peru, U.S. Mid-West, California, Honduras, seriation statistics
Su Bai (1922–2018) Chinese; Chinese Buddhism, grottoes
Su Bingqi (1909–1997) Chinese; ancient China
Eleazar Sukenik (1889–1953) Israeli; Dead Sea scrolls
Sharon Sullivan, Australian heritage conservation
Pál Sümegi (born 1960) Hungarian; environmental archaeology, Hungary
Glenn Summerhayes (born 195?) Australian; East Asia and Pacific archaeology, trade and exchange, development of social complexity, archaeometry 
Rachel Swallow (born 19??) British?; medieval archaeology, landscape archaeology, and castle studies
Naomi Sykes (born 19??) British?; zooarchaeology
Jadwiga Szeptycka (1883–1939) Polish; Roman-period Poland
Senarath Paranavithana (1896 –1972) Sri Lankan,  Archeological Commissioner in 1940

T
Takaku Kenji (born 19??) Japanese; Korea
Zemaryalai Tarzi (born 1939) Afghan; Afghanistan
Joan du Plat Taylor (1906–1983) Scottish; maritime archaeology, Cyprus
Joan J. Taylor (1940–2019) American; British prehistory
Walter Willard Taylor, Jr. (1913–1997) American; theory, Coahuila (Mexico)
Julio C. Tello (1880–1947) Peruvian; Peru
Alexander Thom (1894–1985) Scottish; engineer, Stonehenge
Charles Thomas (1928–2016) Cornish studies
David Hurst Thomas (born 1945), American; Spanish Borderlands, repatriation
Julian Thomas (born 1959) British; north-west European Neolithic and Bronze Age
John Arthur Thompson (1913–2002) Australian; Old Testament scholar and biblical archaeologist
J. Eric S. Thompson (1898–1975) English; Maya
Christian Jürgensen Thomsen (1788–1865) Danish; originator of the Three-Age System
Alan Thorne (1939–2012) Australian; Aboriginal Australian origins and the human genome Lake Mungo, Kow Swamp
Carl L. Thunberg (born 1963) Swedish; Viking Age, Nordic Middle Ages 
Christopher Tilley (born 19??) British; theory, Britain
Norman Tindale (1900–1993) Australian; mapping Australian tribes
Tong Enzheng (1935–1997) Chinese; China
Malcolm Todd (1939–2013) British; classical archaeology
Alfred Marston Tozzer (1877–1954) American; Mesoamerica (Maya)
Arthur Dale Trendall (1909–1995) Australian; Greek ceramics at Apulia
John C. Trever (1916–2006) American; Biblical archaeologist
Bruce Trigger (1937–2006) Canadian; archaeological theory, comparative civilizations, Huronia, Nubia, Egyptology
Olena Vasylivna Tsvek (1931–2020) Ukrainian; Trypillia culture
James Tuck (1940-2019)  American;  eastern Canadian historical archaeology
Ronald F. Tylecote (1916–1990) British; founder of archaeometallurgy
Grigore Tocilescu (1850–1909) Romanian; Dacia
Henrieta Todorova (1933–2015) Bulgarian; Neolithic Bulgaria, excavations at Durankulak
Vassilios Tzaferis (1936–2015) Greek–Israeli; biblical archaeology, Byzantine monasticism

U
Peter Ucko (1938–2007) British; Paleolithic art; archaeological politics
Luigi Maria Ugolini (1895–1936) Italian; Albania
Gary Urton (born 1948) American; Andes
David Ussishkin (born 1935) Israeli; Lachish, Jezreel Valley and Megiddo

V
Laima Vaitkunskienė (born 1936) Lithuanian; Medieval Lithuania
Heiki Valk (born 1959) Estonian; Medieval Estonia
Ron Vanderwal (1938–2021), Australian; Torres Strait, New Guinea
Parviz Varjavand (1934–2007) Iranian; ancient Iran (Persia)
William Jones Varley (died 1976) British; English Iron Age hill forts
Roland de Vaux (1903–1971) French; Biblical archaeology: Dead-Sea Scrolls
Marius Vazeilles (1881–1973) French; Gallo-Roman archaeology, Merovingian archaeology
Bruce Veitch (1957–2005) Australian; Mitchell Plateau and Pilbara Western Australia; Bruce Veitch Award
Alan Vince (1952–2009) British; British ceramics
Zdenko Vinski (1913–1996) Croatian; Croatia
Dominique Vivant Denon (1747–1827) French; Egyptian art
Alexandru Vulpe (1931–2016)

W
Marc Waelkens (1948–2021) Belgian; Turkish archaeology
Tony Waldron (died 2021) British; palaeopathologist and palaeoepidemiologist
Alice Leslie Walker (1885–1954) American, classical archaeologist
Lynley A. Wallis (born 19??) Australian; Indigenous and historical archaeology
Wang Zhongshu (1925–2015) Chinese; Chinese and Japanese archaeology
Graeme K. Ward (born 1943) Australian; Polynesia, Melanesia, Micronesia, Australia; prehistoric archaeology, research funding and administration, rock art
John Bryan Ward-Perkins (1912–1981) British; architectural history
Charles Warren (1840–1927) British; engineer, police commissioner and Biblical archaeologist
Helen Waterhouse (1913–1999), British; classical archaeology
William Thompson Watkin (1836–1888), British; Roman Britain
Trevor Watkins (born 19??) British; Near Eastern archaeology
Patty Jo Watson (born 1932) American; North American archaeology
Clarence H. Webb (1902–1991) American; southern United States prehistory
Robert Wauchope (1909–1979) American; Maya, south-eastern U.S.
Mildred Mott Wedel (1912–1995) American; Great Plains prehistory
Waldo Wedel (1908–1996) American; Great Plains prehistory
Josef W. Wegner (born 1967) American; Egyptology
Friedrich Gottlieb Welcker (1784–1868) German; philologist and archaeologist specializing in Greece
Fred Wendorf (1924–2015) American; archaeology and cultural development of arid environments

David Wengrow (born 1972) English; comparative archaeology

Boyd Wettlaufer (1914–2009) Canadian; Father of Saskatchewan Archaeology
Mortimer Wheeler (1890–1976) British; method, South Asia (especially the early Indus Valley), Maiden Castle (England)
Tessa Verney Wheeler (1893–1936) British; method, British archaeology, co-founder of Institute of Archaeology
Joyce White (born 19??) American; prehistoric Southeast Asia
Theodore E. White (1905-1977) American; archaeozoology
Elizabeth Augustus Whitehead (1928–1983) American; classical archaeology
John C. Whittaker (born 1953) American; experimental archaeology, Palaeolithic
Alasdair Whittle (born 1949) European Neolithic
Caroline Wickham-Jones (1955–2022) British; Orkney, mesolithic, submerged sites
Theodor Wiegand (1864–1936) German; Pergamum, aerial photography
Malcolm H. Wiener (born 1935) American; Aegeanist, Prehistorian, President of INSTAP
Louise van Wijngaarden-Bakker (1940–2021) Dutch; archaeozoology
Gordon Willey (1913–2002) American; New World, method and theory
Stephen Williams (1926-2017) American; North America
Hugh Willmott (born 1972) British; Middle Ages and monastic archaeology
Johann Joachim Winckelmann (1717–1768) German; Hellenist art, Greek world
Bryant G. Wood (born 1936) American; Palestine
Peter Woodman (1943–2017), Irish; Irish Mesolithic
Leonard Woolley (1880–1960) British; Ur in Mesopotamia
Hannah Wormington (1914–1994) American; American Southwest and Paleo-Indians
Jens Jacob Asmussen Worsaae (1821–1885) Danish; paleobotanist, archaeologist, historian and politician, first to excavate and use stratigraphy to prove the Three-age system
George Roy Haslam (Mick) Wright (1924–2014)  Australian; Middle East
Wolfgang W. Wurster (1937–2003) German; architectural history; Mediterranean, high cultures of Peru and Ecuador
Alison Wylie (born 1954) Canadian; philosophy of archaeology
John Wymer (1928–2006) British; Paleolithic

X
Xia Nai (1910–1985) Chinese; China
Xu Xusheng (1888–1976) Chinese; discoverer of the Erlitou culture

Y
Yigael Yadin (1917–1984) Israeli; Masada, Hazor
Yang Jianhua (born 1955) Chinese; Mesopotamia, eastern Eurasia
Yusra (20th century) Palestinian; Tabun, Neanderthals

Z
Inger Zachrisson (born 1936); Swedish; Sami people since the Iron Age
Louise Zarmati (born 1958) Australian; Archaeology in school curricula; women in archaeology; Australia, Crete, Cyprus
Robert N. Zeitlin (born 1935) American; Mesoamerica (Zapotec), ancient political economies
Zhao Kangmin (1936–2018) Chinese; discoverer of the Terracotta Army
Zheng Zhenduo (1898–1958) Chinese; China
Zheng Zhenxiang (born 1929) Chinese; discoverer of the Tomb of Fu Hao
Irit Ziffer (born 1954) Israeli; symbols in ancient art
Andreas Zimmermann (born 1951) German; Neolithic (LBK)
Ezra B. W. Zubrow (born 1945) American; theory, GIS, demography, ecology, Circumpolar
R. Tom Zuidema (1927–2016) Dutch or American?; Incas
Vladas Žulkus (born 1945) Lithuanian; Lithuania (Klaipėda, underwater archaeology)
Marek Zvelebil (1952–2011) Czech; European Stone Age

See also
List of Russian archaeologists
Australian Archaeology
Australian Archaeological Association

External links
ABC GNT History, Australian Archaeologists

References

 
Archaeologists